The Vilayet of Aidin or Aydin also known as Vilayet of Smyrna or Izmir after its administrative centre, was a first-level administrative division (vilayet) of the Ottoman Empire in the south-west of Asia Minor, including the ancient regions of Lydia, Ionia, Caria and western Lycia. It was described by the 1911 Encyclopædia Britannica as the "richest and most productive province of Asiatic Turkey".

The stated accuracy of the population figures ranges from "approximate" to "merely conjectural" depending on the region from which they were gathered. As of 1920, the vilayet had an "exceptionally large" Christian population.

Economy

The British described Aidin Vilayet as having a "remarkable variety of agriculture", as of 1920. They produced grains and cotton, specifically in Aydın and Nazilli. The region also produced opium, tobacco, and valonia oak. Fruit was one of the most popular exports, with figs and grapes being popular. Before World War I, fig production was up, with an expansive increase in production and exportation via railway. Grapes were used to produce raisins and licorice was also produced in the region. It was noted as growing wild along the Büyük Menderes River. It was exported to the United States and United Kingdom.

Aidin, as of 1920, was considered to be the world's supply center for emery, specifically in the areas between Tire and Söke. In the early 20th century, Aidin was also noted for large deposits of chromium, specifically near Mount Olympus and in the southwestern region of the vilayet. Antimony and mercury were also found in the area.

Carpet was manufactured in Vilayet, mainly in Smyrna, but with carpet being made throughout the region, including in Kula, Uşak, Gördes and Isparta. After World War I, sales declined, however, Britain remained a major importer of Turkish carpets from Aidin. Carpets were mainly produced by women.

Environment

As of 1920, the region was noted as having 6,000 square kilometers of forest. The west and southwest had the most thickly forested areas. The British described Makri as being "rich in excellent timber." Cedars were found in Makri, with oak and pine throughout the vilayet. In the early 20th-century, deforestation had begun via private companies of the vilayet. Sawmills had been erected, with Makri having its own steam-run sawmill. Most trees were felled by hand at this time. Tavas also had a timber economy during this period.

1881 Census

Governors

 Mehmed Sabri Pasha (1867-1868)
 Hekim Ismail Pasha (1868-1869)
 Veliüddin Pasha (1869-1870)
 Mehmed Sadik Pasha (1870-1872)
 Hussein Avni Pasha (1872-1872)
 Mustafa Sureyya Pasha (1872-1873)
 Hamdi Pasha (1873-1874)
 Ahmed Rasim Pasha (1874-1875)
 Ahmed Pasha (1875-1875)
 Ahmed Esad Pasha (1875-1875)
 Hurshit Pasha (1875-1876)
 Sabri Pasha (1876-1880)
 Midhat Pasha (1880-1881)
 Ali Pasha (1881-1882)
 Kâmil Pasha (1883-1883)
 Nashit Pasha (1883-1885)
 Halil Rifat Pasha (1885-1886)
 Nafiz Pasha (1886-1889)
 Halil Rifat Pasha (1889-1891)
 Abdurrahman Nureddin Pasha (1891-1893)
 Hasan Fehmi Pasha (1893-1895)
 Kâmil Pasha (1895-1907)
 Faik Bey (1907-1908)
 Sherif Mehmed Rauf Pasha (1908-1909)
 Ali Galib Bey (1909-1909)
 Mehmed Ferid Pasha (1909-1909)
 Kiazim Pasha (1909-1909)
 Mahmud Muhtar Pasha (1909-1910)
 Hussein Nazim Pasha (1910-1911)
 Celâl Bey (1911-1912)
 Ahmed Reshid Rey (1912-1912)
 Hussein Nazim Pasha (1913-1913)
 Rahmi Arslan (1913-1917)
 Hasan Tahsin Uzer (1918-1918)
 Edhem Bey (1918-1919)
 Nureddin Pasha (1919-1919)
 Kambur Izzeddin (1919-1919)

Administrative divisions
Before 1914, the vilayet was subdivided into:
 Smyrna Sanjak, subdivided into the kazas of Smyrna (İzmir, seat of the Vali), Nif, Karaburun, Kuşadası, Çeşme, Ödemiş, Urla, Foça, Bayındır, Menemen, Bergama, Seferihisar and Tire.
 Sarukhan Sanjak, subdivided into the kazas of Manisa, Alaşehir, Kula, Akhisar, Salihli, Gördes, Demirci, Eşme, Kırkağaç, Soma and Kasaba (Turgutlu).
 Aidin Sanjak, subdivided into the kazas of Aydın, Nazilli, Bozdoğan, Söke and Çine.
 Menteshe Sanjak, subdivided into the kazas of Muğla, Milas, Meğri, Bodrum, Köyceğiz and Marmaris.
 Denizli Sanjak, subdivided into the kazas of Denizli, Tavas, Çal, Buldan, Sarayköy and Garbikaraağaç (Acıpayam).

Demographics
In 1893, there were in total 39 Kaza (districts). According to the Ottoman census of that year, in the 35 kazas Muslims were the majority. In the kaza of Izmir there was no majority but Muslims were the largest group. In the kaza of Foça, Urla and Çesme, comprising the Karaburun Peninsula, Greeks were the majority. However, according to American pre-Greco-Turkish War (1919-1922) estimates, the Greek element was the most numerous in Smyrna Sanjak with 375,000 inhabitants, while other groups included Muslims (325,000), Jews (40,000) and Armenians (18,000).

References

External links

 
History of Aydın Province
History of İzmir Province
History of Manisa Province
History of Muğla Province
1867 establishments in the Ottoman Empire